Anthony Lally (born 26 October 1953) is an Irish former road-racing cyclist, who competed in the individual road race event at the 1980 Summer Olympics.

Life
Lally comes from Cabra, an inner suburb west of central Dublin.

Cycling career
Lally raced nationally and internationally from 1971 to 1983.

Lally's father was Mick Lally, honoured by an annual memorial race, or sometimes series of races, by the Dublin Wheelers cycling club, and his elder brothers, Sean and Jimmy, also raced, as did a grandson, Connor.

Later life
Lally retired from competitive cycling and moved to Australia shortly after his Olympic appearance, living in Sydney and working in insurance and pensions, and in 2015 applied for and secured a post on the board of Cycling New South Wales for six months.

References

External links
 

1953 births
Sportspeople from Dublin (city)
Irish male cyclists
Olympic cyclists of Ireland
Cyclists at the 1980 Summer Olympics
Living people